Sydney Bypass refers to a number of roads, existing and proposed, that motorists can use to avoid the congested approaches to the Sydney central business district (CBD). The main bypasses are:
 the Westlink M7 motorway, which allows traffic from Canberra and Melbourne to skirt Sydney's outer suburbs on its way north – this bypass was completed with the opening of the NorthConnex tunnel in October 2020.
 the proposed M9 Outer Sydney Orbital which would connect to the M31 Hume Motorway south of Campbelltown and ultimately link the M1 Pacific Motorway (directly or indirectly) towards Berowra and the Central Coast.
 the currently under construction WestConnex (M4–M5 link). This would form the southern section of an eventual Inner Western Bypass of Sydney's CBD.
 the proposed Western Harbour Tunnel, which would connect a fully completed WestConnex at Rozelle to the Warringah Freeway/Gore Hill Freeway Interchange in North Sydney. This would form the northern section of an eventual Inner Western Bypass of Sydney's CBD.

History
Some disjointed sections of such planned roads were built but during the 1970s, the focus changed and many sections of these proposed roads were never built. Such disjointed segments of freeway can be seen in such places as Hunters Hill near Gladesville Bridge, where segments of the North West Freeway were constructed.

Around this time, freeway planning shifted to building freeways as bypasses.

For decades, it has been desired to construct a freeway standard bypass of Sydney as part of the National Highway, connecting the Pacific Motorway to the Hume Motorway to allow through traffic to be separated from local traffic.

The North West Freeway was originally intended to fork in the Lane Cove Valley, with one fork following what is now the M2 corridor and the other following what is now the Pacific Motorway. If these had been built, traffic would have looped at that fork in much the same way as traffic from Burns Bay Road loops around the approach to Gladesville Bridge to turn west on Victoria Road. The Lane Cove section was abandoned for environmental reasons, leaving the then Sydney-Newcastle Freeway (now Pacific Motorway) to terminate at Pennant Hills Road.

In the 1960s, the Department of Main Roads signposted a number of ring roads via existing surface streets. Of these, only the A3 ring-road remains today.

M7 corridors

In 2001, at the same time as announcing commencement of the M7, the Federal Government proposed that the M7 would form part of a bypass route, with a new road branching off the M1 near Mount White and crossing the Hawkesbury River with a new high-level bridge to join the M7 at its distinct northwestern corner.  Hence, the road would avoid the steep grades of the Mount White section of the Pacific Motorway immediately north of the existing low-level bridges across the Hawkesbury River and would be a quite direct bypass of Sydney that would be separated from much of Sydney's Commuter traffic.

A study was undertaken into options for connecting the Pacific Motorway with the M7.  At the preliminary stage of that study, the Roads & Traffic Authority decided that the primary goal of the new road was the best possible relief of traffic on the existing route, Pennant Hills Road.  Corridors for that proposal were broadly defined as types A, B and C.
Type A options were essentially from the existing end of the M1 to somewhere on the M2.
Type B corridors branched off the M1 in the vicinity of Berowra and crossed the environmentally sensitive Galston Gorge.
Type C corridors were along the general lines of the Federal Government proposal.

The need to reduce traffic on Pennant Hills Road made the reduction of commuter traffic more urgent than that of traffic bypassing Sydney.  As such, type B and C options were rejected early in the planning process.

Four type A options were identified. All involved extensive tunnelling.  One of these, following the Hornsby - Epping railway line near the M1 and underneath Pennant Hills Road towards the M2, was selected as the preferred option.

The background documents to the route study indicate that it is predicted that the M1 will need to be upgraded to 3 lanes each way plus climbing lanes up the hills and will still run out of capacity by 2021, at which time a type C corridor will be needed in addition to the type A tunnel currently proposed.

Plans to construct the M1 to M2 link tunnels were announced in 2013, with construction intended to commence in early 2015 and opened in late 2019. On 16 March 2014, the preferred contractor for construction of the link, now called  NorthConnex, was announced. It will be a pair of tunnels connecting the M2 Motorway near the Pennant Hills Road interchange to the M1 Pacific Motorway north of Pearce's Corner, Wahroonga.

Independent review
On 17 February 2007, the Hon Jim Lloyd MP (the federal Minister for Local Government, Territories and Roads) announced the establishment of an independent review of the F3 to M7 Corridor Selection. The review was carried out by Mahla Pearlman, who is a former Chief Judge of the NSW Land and Environment Court. The report was released on 14 September 2007. The conclusions of the report were that the proposed tunnels should proceed but that planning for the longer term connection between the Pacific Motorway and the M7 should also commence immediately.

Outer Sydney Orbital

M4-M5 Link

Proposed as stage 3 of the WestConnex scheme and built as stage 2 of the M8 Motorway, the M4-M5 link would connect the main western motorway with the airport and south-western motorway.

In early WestConnex documents, this tunnel was referred to as the "M4 South", but before the foundation of the WestConnex Delivery Authority, it had been known as the Inner West Motorway (IWM) in conjunction with the Marrickville Tunnel Motorway (MM) further to the west.  These were contained in plans from the previous Labor government in 2010 known as the "2031 Transport Blueprint".  The IWM was positioned to tunnel under King Street Newtown just as the M4-M5 Link had been publicly announced, and is where the second stage of the M8 Motorway eventually was tunnelled.  The northern half, however, now veers further to the west to meet the eastern end of the WestConnex M4, but achieves the same connection to Victoria Road via the Rozelle Interchange and Iron Cove Link.

Original markings on previous decades of street directories labelled this as an F6 Extension that carried on north to join the original F2 alignment at Victoria Road. This dates back as far as the 1948 County of Cumberland planning scheme.

Western Harbour Tunnel & Beaches Link

The second harbour road tunnel would link the Balmain Peninsula with Lane Cove via a tunnel under Sydney Harbour, emerging to connect with the M2 Hills Motorway in the north. It would also include tunnel links to the Burnt Bridge Creek Deviation in Balgowlah and an upgraded Wakehurst Parkway at Frenchs Forest.

See also

 Highways in Australia
 List of highways in New South Wales

References

Highways in Australia
Bypasses in Australia